The Foreign Legion Command (official) is the Command of the Foreign Legion in the French Army.

The Legion is led by a French general, a Legion officer who is usually a general who spent his entire career in Legion units. COMLE also includes the general staff headquarters of the foreign legion command(official), led by another senior officer, chief of the general staff headquarters of the foreign legion command (official). As of 2017, the general staff headquarters of the foreign legion command includes several divisions related to the functioning of the Legion. The general staff headquarters of the foreign legion command has adopted various inspecting, grouping, and commanding designations since 1931 and has been designated officially as C.O.M.L.E since 1984. The Général de division commanding the Legion, also known as Father of the Legion or Foreign Legion Command Chief  (official) is a direct subordinate of the Chief of Staff of the French Army (C.E.M.A.T). The Division Général is also the technical counselor commanding for the ensemble related to the Legion (recruitment, traditions, employment, regimental formations and security).

The Divisional general commanding the Legion, commands also the 1st Foreign Regiment, the 4th Foreign Regiment and the Foreign Legion Recruiting Group (G.R.L.E). The GRLE was not formed till 2007. The commands of the C.O.M.L.E division general commandant extends to:

 Guardian of Legion Esprit de Corps, Legion Patrimony and Legion Traditions
 Guardian Protector of Personnel Serving at Foreign Status
 Command of General Personnel Administration Operations
 Command of Training and Instructing Procedure Implementations
 Guardian of Legion Communities

The Music of the Foreign Legion (MLE) is led by the Music Chief.

History 

The origins and  history tradition making of Legion regiments was front line opened and led by the Pionniers and charged by the service and sacrifices of the legionnaires following behind their legion regimental, battalion and company commanders since 1831 and serving the commanding Division Général of the Legion since 1931.

The Legion is part of the History of France. it was created by a King, combat engaged at Camarón under an Emperor and has known to endure the most heavy losses under the Republic.

Pionniers & Legion Regiments

Creation and different nominations (1931-1984)

The command of the Foreign Legion is stationed at quartier Vienot in Aubagne at the corps of the 1st Foreign Regiment 1er RE. The headquarters detachment was established in 1984 following the reorganization of the previous Foreign Legion Group (G.L.E). Foreign Legion Command is headed by
a Général.
 On March 2, 1931; the Inspection of the Foreign Legion (I.L.E) was created.
 Between 1934 and 1935, the I.L.E was dissolved.
 In 1948, the I.L.E is recreated.
 On September 1, 1950; the I.L.E was dissolved and the Autonomous Group of the Foreign Legion (G.A.L.E) is created.
 On July 1, 1955; the Foreign Legion Command (C.O.L.E) was created.
 On September 16, 1957; the C.O.L.E became the Technical Inspection of the Foreign Legion (I.T.L.E).
 On July 1, 1964; the I.T.L.E was dissolved.
 On September 1, 1972, creation of the Foreign Legion Groupment (G.L.E) which included the Operational Group of the Foreign Legion (G.O.L.E.).
 On July 1, 1984, the G.L.E became the Foreign Legion Command (C.O.M.L.E).

History of the garrisons, campaigns and battles 

During the interwar period on April 1, 1931, while the Legion reached requirements of 30,000 Legionnaires, général Paul-Frédéric Rollet, was entrusted with the post of Inspector of the Foreign Legion newly created in Tlemcen in Algeria. It is at this moment that the Communal Depot of the Foreign Regiments (D.C.R.E) was created. This Inspector of the Foreign Legion was dissolved with the retirement of the Father of the Legion.

In 1948, the Inspection was recreated for 2 years under the command of Général de division Raoul Magrin-Vernerey. Again dissolved in 1950, the inspection unit left way for the Autonomous Group of the Foreign Legion (G.A.L.E) commanded consecutively by Générals Jean Olié and Paul Gardy which had the attributions of Inspector General. Accordingly, the (G.A.L.E) was composed of one headquarter staff état-major at Sidi bel-Abbès, the Communal Depot of the Legion, the 1st Foreign Infantry Regiment 1er REI that regrouped all training/ instruction units, the intelligence service, and the Moral Service for Works of the Foreign Legion (S.O.M.L.E)

In 1954, at the end of the First Indochina War, the Foreign Legion was reorganized. The 1st Foreign Regiment 1er RE inherited all the attributions of Legion units. The Foreign Legion Command (C.O.L.E) was created on July 1, 1955 at Vincennes; with command ensured by Colonel René Lennuyeux. Two years later on September 16, 1957, the foreign legion command inherited the new naming of Technical Inspection of the Foreign Legion (I.T.L.E). This technical inspection was dissolved in 1964 and its attributions were transferred to the regimental commander of the 1st Foreign Regiment 1er RE.

In 1972, under the impulsion of Colonel Marcel Letestu, a Foreign Legion Groupment (G.L.E) was created which was put at his disposition. Accordingly, Colonel Letestu has immediate authority on the 1st Foreign Regiment 1er RE and the 2nd Foreign Regiment 2e RE and conserved this prerogative of General Inspector. On the other hand, the commander of the (G.L.E) commanded also the 31st Brigade. This experimental unit, Legion dominated was among the first inter-arm brigade. The 31st Brigade engaged in peacekeeping combat operations in Lebanon at the corps of the Multinational Force in Lebanon under the command of Foreign Legion Groupment (G.L.E) Général de brigade Jean-Claude Coullon. The 31e Brigade was subsequently replaced by the 6th Light Armoured Division 6ème D.L.B in 1984 and then became designated as the 6th Light Armoured Brigade 6ème B.L.B following the Gulf War at the corps of Division Daguet.

On July 1, 1984; the (G.L.E) inherited the denomination of Foreign Legion Command (C.O.M.L.E).

Organization

In the mission, the division general commanding the Foreign Legion is assisted by a general staff headquarters which service operations are based on the personnel of the 1st Foreign Regiment 1er R.E and the Foreign Legion Recruiting Group (G.R.L.E). This general staff compromised as of the 2012 of the following Divisions and bureaux:

 Foreign Legion Human Resources Division: Division ensured the management of the ensemble administration of personnel serving at Foreign Status.
Foreign Legion Recruiting Group,: responsible entity for Legion centers of information, Legion recruiting centers, as well as the Legion center of selection and incorporation.
Foreign Legion Information Systems and Communication Division,: Division developed proper applications, administered networks and consulting in material of formation (Information Systems) for the Foreign Legion. The division also supported the Foreign Legion Service Handling of Information.
 Foreign Legion Statistical and Personnel Protection Division: Division handled in material of protection and security, the ensemble of personnel serving at Foreign Status. This division participated at the selection process of candidates at engagement.
 Foreign Legion Communication and Information Division,: Division in charge of institutional communication. This division ran public relations, the media, issue numbers production of Képi Blanc, the monthly of the legion, the administration of information technologies, as well audio cells.
Foreign Legion History and Patrimony Division,: Division handled the conservation preservation and management of the foreign legion, and most notably the management of Foreign Legion Museum.
Foreign Legion Social Work and Aid Bureau,.

As of 2017, the general staff headquarters of the Foreign Legion Command, at the disposition of the Commandant of the Legion, has undergone further organizational structuring and was articulated in various legion divisions revolving around: studies, pilotage and synthesis; human resources; security and protection; patrimony; solidarity and others.

Commanders

Commandement de La Légion Étrangère (1931 - 1984)

Inspector Tenure of the Foreign Legion 
Inspection de la Légion étrangère (I.L.E)

Autonomous Group Tenure of the Foreign Legion 
 Groupement autonome de la Légion étrangère (G.A.L.E)

Foreign Legion Command Tenure 
 Commandement de la Légion étrangère (C.O.L.E)

Technical Inspection Tenure of the Foreign Legion 
Inspection technique de la Légion étrangère (I.T.L.E)

Foreign Legion Groupment Tenure
 Groupement de la Légion étrangère (G.L.E)

Commandement de la Légion Étrangère - C.O.M.L.E - (1984 - present) 

The Foreign Legion Groupment (G.L.E) transitted giving formation to the Foreign Legion Command (C.O.M.L.E) through the command of Général de brigade Jean-Claude Coullon in 1984.

See also
 Majors of the Legion
Chief of the Defence Staff 
Chief of Staff of the French Army (French: Chef d'État-Major de l'Armée de Terre, CEMAT)
Chief of Staff of the French Navy (French: Chef d'État-Major de la Marine, CEMM)
Chief of Staff of the French Air Force (French: Chef d'État-Major de l'Armée de l'Air, CEMAA)
French Special Operations Command (French: Commandement des Opérations Spéciales (COS))
 Honneur et Fidélité
 Swiss Guard
 List of French paratrooper units

References & Notes

French Army
Units of the French Foreign Legion
Military units and formations established in 1931